The Gray Ghost is a 1917 American crime-drama film serial directed by Stuart Paton. It is presumed to be lost.

Cast
 Harry Carter as The Gray Ghost
 Priscilla Dean as Morn Light
 Emory Johnson as Wade Hildreth
 Eddie Polo as Jean Marco
 Gypsy Hart as Cecilia
 Wilton Taylor as Ashby
 Gertrude Astor as Lady Gwendolyn
 Lew Short as Jerry Tyron (credited as Lou Short)
 Richard La Reno as Mr. Olmstead
 John Cook as John Reis
 T. D. Crittenden as Brenner Carlow
 J. Morris Foster as Fred Olmstead
 Francis McDonald as Williams
 Howard Crampton as William Arabin
 Sydney Deane as The Commissioner
 Charles Dorian as Jimmie Pelham of The Star
 Nigel De Brulier as Jacques
Frank Tokunaga as Mora
 Burton Law as Bludso
 Dan Leighton as Brant

Episodes
 The Bank Mystery
 The Mysterious Message
 The Warning
 The Fight
 Plunder
 The House of Mystery
 Caught In The Web
 The Double Floor
 The Pearl Necklace
 Shadows
 The Flaming Meteor
 The Poisoned Ring
 The Tightening Snare
 At Bay
 The Duel
 From Out of The Past

Reception
Like many American films of the time, The Gray Ghost was subject to cuts by city and state film censorship boards. The Chicago Board of Censors refused to issue a permit for Chapter 5 of the serial because it portrayed the methods of an organized band of criminals used in the robbery of a large jewelry store.

See also
 List of film serials
 List of film serials by studio
 List of lost films

References

External links

 

1917 films
1917 crime drama films
1917 lost films
Lost drama films
American crime drama films
American silent serial films
American black-and-white films
Films directed by Stuart Paton
Lost American films
Universal Pictures film serials
1910s American films
Silent American drama films